The ritournelle is a 17th-century dance in quick triple time.
'Ritournelle' is the French equivalent of the Italian musical term 'ritornello'

References

French dances
Baroque dance
Triple time dances
Dance forms in classical music